3280 or variant, may refer to:

In general
 A.D. 3280, a year in the 4th millennium CE
 3280 BC, a year in the 4th millennium BCE
 3280, a number in the 3000 (number) range

Roads numbered 3280
 Louisiana Highway 3280, a state highway
 Texas Farm to Market Road 3280, a state highway
 County Road 3280 (Walton County, Florida)

Other uses
 3280 Grétry, an asteroid in the Asteroid Belt, the 3280th asteroid registered

See also

 , a WWI U.S. Navy cargo ship